Lirularia parcipicta, common name the few-spot lirularia, is a species of sea snail, a marine gastropod mollusk in the family Trochidae, the top snails.

Description
The shell grows to a height of 6 mm.

Distribution
This species occurs in the Pacific Ocean from Alaska to Mexico.

References

External links
 To Biodiversity Heritage Library (1 publication)
 To Encyclopedia of Life
 To USNM Invertebrate Zoology Mollusca Collection
 To ITIS
 To World Register of Marine Species

parcipicta
Gastropods described in 1864